Over Haddon is a civil parish in the Derbyshire Dales district of Derbyshire, England.  The parish contains eight listed buildings that are recorded in the National Heritage List for England.  All the listed buildings are designated at Grade II, the lowest of the three grades, which is applied to "buildings of national importance and special interest". The parish contains the village of Over Haddon and the surrounding countryside.  The listed buildings consist of three farmhouses and associated structures, a former cotton mill and sluice gate, a footbridge over the River Lathkill, a house, a church, and a telephone kiosk.


Buildings

References

Citations

Sources

 

Lists of listed buildings in Derbyshire